Blue Stahli is a Los Angeles, CA-based electronic rock project that was created by multi-instrumentalist Bret Autrey. He has released 9 studio albums, 5 of which are instrumental based, and the other 4 are vocal based. He has also released 5 compilation albums, 25 singles and has released 7 music videos. Most singles have been released already onto albums, and there is currently 1 re-release.

Albums

Studio albums

Compilations

Extended plays

Singles

Although originally released under the name Blue Stahli, "Never Dance Again" and "Sunset Neon" (of Antisleep Vol.4) are now labeled as both Blue Stahli and Sunset Neon songs. The track "Metrocenter 84" originally released as a single in 2016 under Blue Stahli, however has since been relocated to his project, Sunset Neon.  Both "Never Dance Again" and "Metrocenter 84" will be released on the Sunset Neon debut album Starlight.

Remixes and guest appearances

Music videos

References

Rock music group discographies
Discographies of American artists